Flavy-le-Martel is a commune in the Aisne department in Hauts-de-France in northern France. Flavy-le-Martel station has rail connections to Saint-Quentin and Amiens. It is the sister city of Carthage, North Carolina, USA.

Population

See also
 Communes of the Aisne department

References

Communes of Aisne
Aisne communes articles needing translation from French Wikipedia